Syed Nayyar Hussain (born 16 January 1936) is a former Pakistani cricketer who played first-class cricket between 1955 and 1978.

Nayyar Hussain made his first-class debut for Central Zone against the touring Indians in 1954-55, scoring 60 not out in a team total of 123 in the first innings, and taking two wickets. Over the next few seasons he appeared regularly for Combined Services, having moderate success as a middle-order batsman and occasional leg-spinner.

He established himself as an all-rounder in 1964-65, when in six matches he took 23 wickets at an average of 14.34 and scored 427 runs at 47.44. Combined Services played two matches that season in the Ayub Trophy: he took 5 for 25 and 6 for 61 and top-scored in each innings with 57 and 28 in a four-wicket victory over Sargodha, then a few days later he took 7 for 55 and 1 for 63 and top-scored with 58 and then second-top-scored with 46 in a three-wicket loss to Lahore Education Board. Playing for Rawalpindi Greens in the Quaid-e-Azam Trophy, he scored his only first-class century, 125 against Pakistan International Airlines.

The Combined Services team went into abeyance after the 1964-65 season. Nayyar Hussain played two matches for Lahore Greens in the next three seasons. When Combined Services returned to first-class level in 1976-77 he was appointed captain, and resumed his career at the age of 41 to lead the team in the Patron's Trophy in 1976-77 and 1977-78. In his last match, against Peshawar, he bowled 59 overs and took 4 for 77 and 4 for 161.

References

External links
 

1936 births
Living people
Pakistani cricketers
Combined Services (Pakistan) cricketers
Lahore cricketers
Rawalpindi cricketers
People from Aligarh